Stigmella grandistyla is a moth of the family Nepticulidae. It was described by Puplesis in 1994. It is known from Georgia.

The larvae feed on Pyrus species. They probably mine the leaves of their host plant.

References

Nepticulidae
Moths of Asia
Moths described in 1994